Luchenza is a town located in the Southern Region district of Thyolo in Malawi.

The town has a railway station on the Sena railway, under concession of Central East African Railways.

Demographics

References

Populated places in Southern Region, Malawi